Bacteridium carinatum is a species of sea snail, a marine gastropod mollusk in the family Pyramidellidae and the genus Bacteridium.

Distribution
The vast majority of this species is distributed within marine terrain off the west coast of Africa (Cape Verdes) and its countries on the west coast, Angola, Namibia, Gabon, and in the demersal zone of the Mediterranean Sea

References

Sources
Sealifebase.org: Bacteridium carinatum 
 Vaught, K.C. (1989). A classification of the living Mollusca. American Malacologists: Melbourne, FL (USA). . XII, 195 pp.
 Rolán E., 2005. Malacological Fauna From The Cape Verde Archipelago. Part 1, Polyplacophora and Gastropoda.
 Templado, J. and R. Villanueva, 2010 Checklist of Phylum Mollusca. pp. 148–198 In Coll, M., et al., 2010. The biodiversity of the Mediterranean Sea: estimates, patterns, and threats. PLoS ONE 5(8):36pp.

External links
 To World Register of Marine Species

Pyramidellidae
Gastropods described in 1870
Molluscs of the Atlantic Ocean
Molluscs of the Mediterranean Sea
Molluscs of Angola
Gastropods of Cape Verde
Invertebrates of Gabon